The Ruth Rendell Mysteries is a British television crime drama series, produced by TVS and later by its successor Meridian Broadcasting, in association with Blue Heaven Productions, for broadcast on the ITV network. Twelve series were broadcast on ITV between 2 August 1987 and 11 October 2000. Created by renowned author Ruth Rendell, the first six series focused entirely on her main literary character, Chief Inspector Reg Wexford, played by George Baker. Repeat airings of these series changed the programme's title to The Inspector Wexford Mysteries. However, later series shifted focus to other short stories previously written by Rendell, with Wexford featuring in only three further stories, in 1996, 1998 and 2000. When broadcast, these three stories were broadcast under the title Inspector Wexford.

In some cases stories were expanded from Rendell's original material or elements from a number of stories were woven together into one episode. A smaller number of episodes were based on Rendell's full-length novels, such as The Strawberry Tree starring Simon Ward, Going Wrong starring James Callis, A Case of Coincidence starring Keith Barron and Ronald Pickup, Front Seat starring Janet Suzman, and The Lake of Darkness starring Jerome Flynn. A total of fifty-five episodes featured Inspector Wexford, alongside his wife Dora (Louie Ramsay) and his assistant DI Mike Burden (Christopher Ravenscroft). A total of twenty-nine episodes focused on other characters.

The first six series were released on VHS, but have never been released on DVD due to licensing rights issues with The Walt Disney Company, who owns Television South's back catalogue of programming. Series seven to twelve have since been released on DVD as a Best Of box set, omitting four episodes.

Cast
 George Baker as DCI Reg Wexford (Series 1—6, 9, 11—12)
 Christopher Ravenscroft as DI Mike Burden (Series 1—6, 9, 11—12)
 Louie Ramsay as Dora Wexford (Series 1—6, 9, 11—12)
 Deborah Poplett as Sheila Wexford (Series 1—6, 9, 11)
 Charon Bourke as Sylvia Wexford (Series 2—6, 9, 11—12)
 Emma Smith as Pat Burden (Series 1—6)
 Diane Keen as Jenny Burden (Series 4—6, 9, 11—12)
 Ann Penfold as Jean Burden (Series 1—4)
 Noah Huntley as John Burden (Series 1—4)
 Ken Kitson as DS Tommy Martin (Series 1—6)
 Isobel Middleton as DS Karen Malahyde (Series 2—6, 9, 11—12)
 Colin Campbell as Sgt Willoughby (Series 2—6)
 Dave Hill as DCC Freeborn (Series 3—6)
 John Burgess as Dr. Len Croker (Series 2—6)
 Gary Mavers as Colin Budd (Series 1—6, 9, 11—12)

Episodes

Series 1 (1987)

Series 2 (1988)

Series 3 (1989)

Series 4 (1990)

Series 5 (1991)

Series 6 (1992)
This was the last series to solely feature Inspector Wexford. Subsequent series shifted focus onto other characters previously featured in short stories by Rendell.

Series 7 (1992—1994)
This series was the first series not to feature Inspector Wexford, with focus being shifted to other leading characters from Rendell's repertoire of short stories.

Series 8 (1995)

Series 9 (1996)

Series 10 (1997)

Series 11 (1998)

Series 12 (1999—2000)

Media releases
The first six series were released on VHS on 21 January 2000 via IMC Vision. This was shortly before the rights to Television South's back-catalogue were purchased by The Walt Disney Company during their purchase of Fox Family Worldwide in 2001, which has subsequently led to all other TVS programmes being unavailable for commercial release on VHS or DVD.

Subsequently, the remaining six series were released on DVD on 9 April 2007, as The Best Of Ruth Rendell Mysteries, via Network. As these series were not produced by TVS, the licensing rights became available for a DVD release. However, four episodes were omitted ("Heartstones", "The Strawberry Tree", "Thornapple" and "Talking to Strange Men"), none of which have ever been commercially released. Again, the remaining six series were released on DVD in the United States on 24 June 2008. Series seven-twelve have since been repeated on ITV3 and ITV Encore, however, once again the four episodes omitted from the DVD were not broadcast, suggesting that the licensing rights for these episodes are no longer available.

References

External links

British Film Institute Screen online

1980s British crime television series
1990s British crime television series
2000s British crime television series
ITV television dramas
Television shows based on British novels
1987 British television series debuts
2000 British television series endings
1980s British drama television series
1990s British drama television series
2000s British drama television series
Television series by ITV Studios
Detective television series
English-language television shows
British crime drama television series
ITV mystery shows
Television shows produced by Television South (TVS)
Television shows produced by Meridian Broadcasting
Television shows set in Hampshire
1980s British mystery television series
1990s British mystery television series
2000s British mystery television series